Herb and Jamaal is a comic strip by Stephen Bentley syndicated by Creators Syndicate. It is published daily and centers on the eponymous friends who run a diner together, inspired by the illustrator's experience at a high school reunion, and a desire to provide increased representation for black people in comics. According to Bentley, "Some of the characters in 'Herb and Jamaal' partially come from myself and people that I know but the full story is just a fantasy..."

Story and  characters
The strip centers around the title characters and the diner they run together.
 Herbert Johnson, a former quality control technician at the gas works, a schemer, but not underhanded.
 Jamaal J. Jamaal, a former NBA center for the Phazers (a fictional team).
 Sarah Johnson, Herb's wife, whose cooking leaves a lot to be desired.
 Uhuru Johnson, Herb and Sarah's daughter.
 Ezekiel Johnson, Herb and Sarah's son.  His middle name is Nicholas.
 Eula, Sarah's mother, who never hesitates to let Herb know what she thinks of him.
 Yolanda, the object of Jamaal's fawning affection. The feeling is only somewhat reciprocated.
 Kim, a postal worker.
 Mr. C, a blond customer who often visits the diner. Bentley said that Mr. C's name began as Charles to honor a childhood friend.  However, some took it to be a derogatory reference ("Mister Charlie" was used within the African American community to refer to an imperious white man or a man in charge), so he shortened it.  He now thinks of it as C for Common.
 Ed, a curly-haired diner patron.
 Reverend Croom
 Deacon Derek
 Ernie, a taxi driver who also always wears sunglasses.

References

External links
Herb and Jamaal at GoComics

1989 comics debuts
American comic strips
African-Americans in comic strips